Muran can refer to:

Muran languages
Muráň, a village in Slovakia
Muráň Castle, a castle in the village in Slovakia
Muran, Iran, a village in Iran
Muran, Ardabil, a village in Iran
Muran District, an administrative subdivision of Iran
Muran Rural District, an administrative subdivision of Iran
Muran (film), a Tamil-language film
Azathioprine, by trade name Muran

See also
 Moran (disambiguation)